Lazbuddie is an unincorporated community in Parmer County, Texas, United States. Named for local business owner, Luther "Laz" Green, and his partner, Andrew "Buddie" Sherley, the community grew up around the store they opened in 1924. Later a post office and school were established.  The town has two cotton gins, a grain elevator, a hardware store, and several churches. The community's focal point is the Lazbuddie Independent School District which educates children from the surrounding rural area. Six-man football is played at Lazbuddie High School. On May 10
, 1991, 3 tornadoes hit the ground in Lazbuddie and the event was caught on camera by farmers.

External links

Lazbuddie Independent School District
Cemeteries of Texas - Lazbuddie Cemetery

Unincorporated communities in Parmer County, Texas
Unincorporated communities in Texas
Populated places established in 1924
1924 establishments in Texas